Coolah Tops is a national park located in New South Wales, Australia,  northwest of Sydney, established on 5 July 1996. It is managed by the New South Wales National Parks and Wildlife Service. Its World Conservation Union category is II.

The park features waterfalls that plunge from the plateau. Giant grass trees and open forest with stands of snow gums shelter gliders, wallabies, eagles and owls.

It is home to one of the largest populations of greater gliders in Australia.

Camping and walking are the main recreational activities performed here. Views from the tops are possible over the Liverpool Plains.

The sources of the Talbragar River and the Coolaburragundy River lie in the park.

The park is managed consistent with a statutory plan of management adopted in 2003.

See also
 Protected areas of New South Wales

References

National parks of New South Wales
Protected areas established in 1996
1996 establishments in Australia